Dehgolan (also Romanized as Dehgolān; also known as Dewlan and Deolan) is a city and capital of Dehgolan County, Kurdistan Province, Iran. At the 2016 census, its population was 45,386, in 9,920 families. The city is populated by Kurds.

References

External links

Website for Dehgolan County

Towns and villages in Dehgolan County
Cities in Kurdistan Province
Kurdish settlements in Kurdistan Province